Romainmôtier Priory is a former Cluniac priory in the municipality of Romainmôtier-Envy in the canton of Vaud in Switzerland.  The monastery was founded by Romanus of Condat, after whom it was named. It is entered on the Swiss inventory of cultural property of national and regional significance.

History

Early Monastery
The first monastery at Romainmôtier was built around 450 by Romanus of Condat.  Romanus was born about 400 and died in 463 or 464.  When he was thirty-five years old he went into the lonely region of Condat to live as a hermit, where after a while his younger brother Lupicinus followed him. A large number of scholars, among whom was Saint Eugendus, placed themselves under the direction of the two holy brothers who founded several monasteries including Romainmôtier (Romanum monasterium) in the canton of Vaud in Switzerland.  Romanus was ordained a priest by Saint Hilary of Arles in 444, and with Lupicinus he directed these monasteries until his death.  Two lives of him are in existence: one by Gregory of Tours in the "Liber vitae patrum", and an anonymous "Vita Sanctorum Romani, Lupicini, Eugendi".  It is Gregory of Tours that gives the date of 450.  Only a rhymed chronicle from the 13th century and the writings of Commissioner Aymonnet Pollen (1519) describe the founding of Romainmôtier Priory.  Excavations carried out in 1905-15 discovered traces of a church dating from the 5th century, which confirmed this early date.  In the 6th century, there is a record of an abbot Florianus who was abbas ex monasterio de Romeno, which is probably a reference to Romainmôtier.

Second expansion
The early monastery fell into disrepair and was rebuilt by Duke Chramnelenus. This rebuilt monastery was placed under the monastic rule of Saint Columbanus by 642.  In 649 Saint Wandregisel, the future abbot of Fontenelle Abbey, visited Romainmôtier and found a thriving and diverse monastic life. The 5th-century church was enlarged and in the 7th century a second church was built with a rectangular choir. The second church was built on the south side of the first. Pope Stephen II visited the monastery in 753 while traveling for a meeting with Pepin the Short and according to tradition consecrated the churches of Saints Peter and Paul.

In the 9th century Romainmôtier saw another period of decline. Lay abbots took possession of the monastery. In 888, the Guelph King Rudolf I of Burgundy gave the priory and its lands to his sister Adelheid or Adelaide, the wife of the Duke of Burgundy, Richard II.  On 14 June 928/929, Adelaide gave the monastery and its lands to Cluny Abbey.  However, for the monastery nothing changed because it remained a possession of the Burgundian royal family. During this period, the monastery was home to a community of Canons Regular rather than monks. At some point between 966 and 990, King Conrad of Burgundy finally renounced all his rights and gave the monastery to Abbot Maiolus of Cluny. Under Cluny Abbey, Romainmôtier Priory experienced its third golden age.

The medieval monastery
Abbot Odilo of Cluny, who resided more than once in Romainmôtier, had the present church built at the end of the 10th century. This church was modeled after the second church of Cluny Abbey (Cluny II). At the beginning of the 12th century, the church was modified by the construction of an ornate narthex and in the 13th century of a gatehouse. The last modifications were made to the church in 1445. The monastery church of Romainmôtier is one of the most important examples of Cluniac Romanesque art in Switzerland.

While Odilo had managed Romainmôtier himself, his successors remained at Cluny Abbey and were represented by a prior. Until the end of the 12th century, this office was only granted for a limited number of years; later it became a lifetime appointment. In the 10th and 11th centuries, the monastery was fighting against aristocratic families of the region (Grandson, Salins) who were trying to expand their estates at the expense of the priory. These conflicts ended at the beginning of the 12th century. However, the pariage of 1181, in which Beatrix of Burgundy, the wife of Frederick Barbarossa, and the priory divided their rights, appears not to have been followed. Until the 14th century the priory was under Imperial protection. The lord of Les Clées exercised oversight on behalf of his feudal lords, particularly the Savoys.

The property of the priory included the territory around the monastery, which was known as La Poté (derived from the Latin word potestas), or Terre de Romainmôtier. By 1050, this property consisted of twelve villages. The priory also possessed land in Apples and in Bannans in Franche-Comté. They owned rights or smallholdings in 45 other locations. In the 12th century, small priories were established in Bursins, Mollens, Vufflens-la-Ville, Vallorbe and Lay-Damvautier to manage the far-flung holdings of Romainmôtier. The small priories had all become independent from Romainmôtier by the 14th century. The priories of Bevaix and Corcelles were affiliated with Romainmôtier in the 12th century, but until its secularization during the Protestant Reformation, they retained a certain independence.  In the 11th century, they founded a hospital in Orbe, which operated until the mid-13th century.

In the 11th century, the inhabitants of the Poté were still serfs, but in 1266 they were awarded a special legal status: they possessed personal freedom and were allowed to dispose freely of their goods, but were obliged to be faithful to the prior. If they moved outside the Poté or swore loyalty to another noble, they were expelled from the dominion and lost any items that they had been given by the priory. A familia grew up around the prior consisting of laity who worked for the priory. It included artisans (bakers, cooks, porters, clerk, etc.), officers who worked in the villages as administrators or as local police, and citizens of the city of Romainmôtier. Those of the familia class were not subject to compulsory service or collective work, but were required to pay the heriot or death tax.

The early modern and modern monastery
After a financial crisis in the 14th century, the monastery recovered and reached the height of its power at the end of the 14th and early 15th century. In the mid-15th century it passed into the secular hands of the Savoy dynasty and their associates. The income of the abbey became a source of personal income, and the monastic rules were less and less respected. When the Protestant Reformation arrived (1536), the monastery was already on the decline. In the 14th century about twenty monks still lived in the priory. By the 16th century it was about ten.

Despite the protests of Fribourg, Bern secularized the priory on 27 January 1537. The priory church was now used for Reformed service, and the cloister was destroyed. The prior's house was converted into a castle for the Bernese Vogt, and the remaining buildings were rented or sold. Only some of the more distant properties escaped being taken by Bern. Some monks settled in Vaux-et-Chantegrue and created a simple countryside priory, which was abolished during the French Revolution. The priory buildings were restored in 1899–1915 and again in 1992–2000.

References

Monasteries under the Columban Rule in Switzerland
Cluniac monasteries in Switzerland
450 establishments
Monasteries dissolved under the Swiss Reformation
Monasteries destroyed during the French Revolution
Buildings and structures in the canton of Vaud
Tourist attractions in the canton of Vaud
5th-century establishments in Switzerland